The Winning of Sally Temple is a surviving 1917 American drama silent film directed by George Melford and written by Rupert Sargent Holland and Harvey F. Thew. The film stars Fannie Ward, Jack Dean, Walter Long, Horace B. Carpenter, William Elmer and Paul Weigel. The film was released on February 19, 1917, by Paramount Pictures.

Plot
The story takes place in early 18th century England. Sally Temple (played by Fannie Ward) is pursued by many men. She goes on a series of comedic misadventures, sometimes resulting in becoming somewhat undressed. Eventually she chooses a husband.

Cast
Fannie Ward as Sally Temple
Jack Dean as Lord Romsey
Walter Long as Duke of Chatto
Horace B. Carpenter as Oliver Pipe
William Elmer as Tom Jellitt
Paul Weigel as Talbot
Henry Woodward as Lord Verney
Harry Jay Smith as Lord Dorset
Eugene Pallette as Sir John Gorham
Florence Smythe as Kate Temple
John McKinnon as Gregory
Vola Vale as Lady Pamela Vauclain

Preservation
A print is preserved and held in the Library of Congress collection.

References

External links

1910s English-language films
Silent American drama films
1917 drama films
Paramount Pictures films
Films directed by George Melford
American black-and-white films
American silent feature films
1910s American films